MAP kinase-activated protein kinase 3 is an enzyme that in humans is encoded by the MAPKAPK3 gene.

Function 

This gene encodes a member of the Ser/Thr protein kinase family. This kinase functions as a mitogen-activated protein kinase (MAP kinase)- activated protein kinase. MAP kinases are also known as extracellular signal-regulated kinases (ERKs), act as an integration point for multiple biochemical signals. This kinase was shown to be activated by growth inducers and stress stimulation of cells. In vitro studies demonstrated that ERK, p38 MAP kinase and Jun N-terminal kinase were all able to phosphorylate and activate this kinase, which suggested the role of this kinase as an integrative element of signaling in both mitogen and stress responses. This kinase was reported to interact with, phosphorylate and repress the activity of E47, which is a basic helix-loop-helix transcription factor known to be involved in the regulation of tissue-specific gene expression and cell differentiation.

Interactions 

MAPKAPK3 has been shown to interact with MAPK14 and TCF3.

References

Further reading 

 
 
 
 
 
 
 
 
 
 
 

EC 2.7.11